Chelopech is a village in the western part of Bulgaria. It is the only village in the Chelopech Municipality, Sofia Province.

Geographical outline 

The major railroad connecting Sofia and Burgas passes through the village.

History 

The history of the village dates back to antiquity, which is proved by the remains, discovered on its territory - the "Ginova Mogila", "Gradishte", etc.  The name of the village is first mentioned in a preserved Turkish document which dates back to the year 1430. It was designated an independent municipality on 15 August 1991.

Chelopech Hill on Trinity Peninsula in Antarctica is named after the village.

Cultural and natural resources 

The St. Nikolas the Wonderworker Church was built in 1835.

Demographics
According to December 2018, there are 1,526 people residing in Chelopech, most of whom ethnic Bulgarians (95%), followed by Romani people (4%).

Religion 
According to the latest Bulgarian census of 2011, the religious composition, among those who answered the optional question on religious identification, was the following: 

An overwhelming majority of the population of Chelopech Municipality identify themselves as Christians. At the 2011 census, 86.2% of respondents identified as Orthodox Christians belonging to the Bulgarian Orthodox Church.

Industry 

Copper mining is the main branch of the local producing structure. Chelopech is the biggest and richest copper-gold-pyrites deposit in Europe, which is one of the reasons for the stable economic situation in the region.

Gallery

References

External links 
Official site of the Chelopech Municipality
Extraction and processing of the copper/gold Chelopech Deposit

Villages in Sofia Province
Mining communities in Europe